Teletext Holidays was a British travel company that specialized in the sale of short and long haul beach holidays, city breaks, UK getaways and cruises. The company ceased trading as of 29 October 2021.

Headquarters
Teletext Holidays is headquartered in Richmond, London. Truly Travel, Teletext Holidays’ Travel Agent partner has offices in London alongside a customer call center and additional back office support, including marketing operations, based in Hyderabad and editorial team in Noida, India.

History
In 2009, Teletext Holidays announced it would shut down its information service on analogue and digital television by the year's end. As well as this, in 2021 the website was closed, no longer taking bookings.

References

External links

Travel and holiday companies of the United Kingdom
Companies based in London
1993 establishments in the United Kingdom
Teletext